Saurichnium is an ichnogenus of dinosaur footprint. Traces of different species of this genus have been found at Otjihaenamparero in central Namibia.

See also

 List of dinosaur ichnogenera

References

Dinosaur trace fossils
Omingonde Formation
Theropods